Oshabeni is a semi township place making up the outskirt of a small town, Portshepstone, in the Hibiscus Coast Municipality south of the KwaZulu-Natal province of South Africa. It is governed by the local government as well as the Zulu Tribal authority under the leadership of Inkosi Sithembiso kaZiwengu Lushaba. There are two high schools: Malusi High and Mangquzuka High. Other educational institutions include ECD institutions, three primary schools, and a Tvet college. There are two companies located near the area which create job opportunities for local residents.

References

Populated places in the Jozini Local Municipality